Sant'Elena is an island of Venice.  It lies at the eastern tip of the main island group and forms part of  sestiere of Castello.  The original island was separated by an arm of the Venetian Lagoon from Venice itself, and was centred on the Church of Sant'Elena and its monastery, originally built in the twelfth century and rebuilt in the 15th.

In the 1920s, the island was expanded to fill in the gap; it is linked to the rest of the city by three bridges.  It includes the Rimembranze Park, a naval college and a football stadium, Stadio Pier Luigi Penzo, in addition to residential areas and Venice Bienniale buildings.

The belltower has a ring of 6 bells in B rung with the Veronese bellringing art.

Gallery

External links
Satellite image from Google Maps

Geography of Venice
Islands of the Venetian Lagoon